Karsten Braasch and Sargis Sargsian were the defending champions, but Sargsian did not compete this year. Braasch teamed up with Philipp Kohlschreiber and lost in the semifinals to José Acasuso and Óscar Hernández.

Lucas Arnold Ker and Mariano Hood won the title by defeating Acasuso and Hernández 7–6(7–5), 6–1 in the final.

Seeds

Draw

Draw

References

External links
 Main draw (ATP)
 ITF tournament profile

Tennis tournaments in Romania
2004 in tennis
Romanian Open